Emilian Ioan Dolha (born 3 November 1979) is a Romanian former footballer who played as a goalkeeper. Dolha previously played in his native Romania for Rapid București, Olimpia Satu Mare, Gloria Bistriţa and Dinamo București, he spent two years in Poland, playing for Wisła Kraków and Lech Poznań and he also played in Russia, for Fakel Voronezh.

International career
Emilian Dolha played two friendly games at international level for Romania, making his debut on 8 December 2000 under coach László Bölöni in a 3–2 victory against Algeria. His second game was a 3–0 victory against Georgia.

Honours
Rapid București
Liga I: 2002–03
Cupa României: 2001–02, 2005–06
Supercupa României: 2002, 2003

References

External links

1979 births
Living people
People from Turda
Romanian footballers
Association football goalkeepers
Romania youth international footballers
Romania under-21 international footballers
Romania international footballers
Liga I players
Liga II players
ACF Gloria Bistrița players
FC Olimpia Satu Mare players
FC Rapid București players
FC Dinamo București players
FC Universitatea Cluj players
FC Argeș Pitești players
Ekstraklasa players
Wisła Kraków players
Lech Poznań players
FC Fakel Voronezh players
Romanian expatriate footballers
Expatriate footballers in Poland
Romanian expatriate sportspeople in Poland
Expatriate footballers in Russia
Romanian expatriate sportspeople in Russia